The list of honorary doctors of Auckland University of Technology below shows the recipients of honorary doctorates (HonD) bestowed by Auckland University of Technology (AUT) since it was granted university status in 2000.

References 

 
Lists of New Zealand people
Auckland University of Technology
New Zealand education-related lists